This is a list of racers that took part in one or more Superbike World Championship races, since the championship was established in 1988. Wildcard riders are included in the list.

The list is accurate up to November 1, 2019.
All stats from 

Key
Present = racing in the 2019 SBK season

A

B

C

D

E

F

G

H

I

J

K

L

M

N

O

P

Q

R

S

T

U

V

W

X

Y

Z

References 

Superbike World Championship riders
racers